The PAC MFI-17 Mushshak (Urdu: مشاق) (English: Proficient) is a license-built fixed-gear basic trainer aircraft manufactured by PAC. An improved version of the Saab Safari (MFI-15), the MFI-17 is manufactured in Kamra, Pakistan, by Pakistan Aeronautical Complex (PAC). Built to Mil-Spec and fully aerobatic, it is used for training, towing and other ground support roles. An upgraded version, the PAC Super Mushshak, has also been produced by PAC. As of 2022, there were 477 MFI-15/17/395 in use, making it one of the most commonly used training aircraft in the world.

Development

The MFI-15 Safari and MFI-17 Supporter were created from Saab's adaptation of the MFI-9 Junior for basic training for civil and military operators. 
In 1968 Saab began work on its MFI-15, based on the MFI-9 but with some design changes. Foremost of the changes in the Saab built MFI-15 prototype was the 120 kW (160shp) Lycoming IO-320 piston engine. Like the MFI-9, the MFI-15 retained the unusual braced, mid-mounted and slightly forward-swept wing and rearward-hinged canopy, offering good all-around vision. The prototype made its maiden flight on June 11, 1969. Follow-up testing of the MFI-15 resulted in a more powerful IO-360 engine, while the horizontal tail was relocated to prevent it being damaged by thrown up debris. The first flight of this modified form was in February 1971.

Sold as the MFI-15 Safari, most went to civil customers, however Sierra Leone and Norway took delivery of Safaris for military pilot training. To improve the Safari's military market appeal, Saab developed the MFI-17 Supporter, fitted with six underwing hardpoints for light and practice weaponry, giving it weapons training and light COIN capabilities. First flight was on July 6, 1972. Important were Denmark and Zambia. Production ended in the late 1970s after about 250 Safaris and Supporters had been built, mostly for civil customers.

Pakistan has taken delivery of 18 Supporters, while 92 have been assembled locally by PAC from knocked down kits and a further 149 were built locally by PAC. It is named Mushshak ("Proficient") in Pakistani service. In 1981, Pakistan acquired sole manufacturing rights of the Supporter. The development of the MFI-395 in 1995 initiated by the then-managing director of AMF, Air Cdr Muhammad Younas. The aircraft was built by upgrading the MFI-17 with an advanced 260 hp engine, electrical instruments, dual flight control systems and a Bendix RSA fuel injection system.

As of 2022, there were 477 MFI-15/17/395 in use, making it one of the most commonly used training aircraft in the world.

Design
Fitted with an American 260 hp engine, cockpit air conditioning, electrical instruments, and electric/manual elevator and rudder trim, the aircraft has been developed to meet FAR part 23 certification in normal, utility and aerobatics categories. It has a spacious side-by-side cockpit allowing good contact between the pilot and the co-pilot/observer or between the student and the instructor.

Variants
Pakistan Aeronautical Complex unveiled a light attack variant of the Super Mushshak in March 2019. The aircraft is capable of launching Barq laser-guided and anti-tank missiles. The Super Mushshak is in use by several countries, including the Pakistan Air Force, Azerbaijani Air Force and the Nigerian Air Force.

Operators

Military operators

 Azerbaijani Air and Air Defence Force – 10.

 Iran Air Force – 25.
  
 Nigerian Air Force – 10 delivered as of January 2018. Nigeria temporarily operated four Pakistani Air Force Super Mushshaks for early training. The contract included the deployment of Pakistani pilots and technicians to assist the Nigerians.

 Royal Air Force of Oman – 8

 Approximately 337 operational with the Pakistan Armed Forces - 217 with Pakistan Army, 120 Super Mushshak with Pakistan Air Force (4 Super Mushshak were loaned temporarily to Nigeria)

 Qatar Emiri Air Force - 8 on order, first batch of 4 delivered in July 2017

 Royal Saudi Air Force - 20

 Turkish Air Force – 52

Specifications (MFI-17 Mushshak)

See also

References

External links

 Official PAC website – MFI-17 Mushshak webpage 
 PakTribune.com PAF Training Crafts: MFI-17 Mushshak
  Airliners.net MFI-17 picture gallery
 MFI-17 factsheet at VectorSite.net

Mushshak
2000s Pakistani aircraft
Single-engined tractor aircraft
Shoulder-wing aircraft
Aircraft first flown in 1981